Allen-Bradley is the brand-name of a line of factory automation equipment owned by Rockwell Automation. The company, with revenues of approximately US $6.4 billion in 2013, manufactures programmable logic controllers (PLC), human-machine interfaces, sensors, safety components and systems, software, drives and drive systems, contactors, motor control centers, and systems of such products. Rockwell Automation also provides asset-management services including repair and consulting. Rockwell Automation's headquarters is in Milwaukee, Wisconsin.

The Allen-Bradley Clock Tower is a Milwaukee landmark featuring the largest four-sided clock in the western hemisphere.

History 
The company was founded in 1903 as the Compression Rheostat Company by Dr. Stanton Allen and Lynde Bradley with an initial investment of $1,000. In 1910 the firm was renamed Allen-Bradley Company; for nearly a century it provided the bulk of discrete resistors used for electronics and other products. In 1952 it opened a subsidiary in Galt, Ontario, Canada, that employs over 1000 people. In 1985 a company record was set as the fiscal year ended with $1 billion in sales. In February 1985, Rockwell International purchased Allen-Bradley for $1.651 billion (equivalent to $ in ), which is the largest acquisition in Wisconsin history. Allen-Bradley essentially took control of Rockwell's industrial automation division.

Rockwell eventually moved its headquarters to Milwaukee.  In 2002, when Rockwell split into two companies, Allen-Bradley followed the automation division into Rockwell Automation.

References

External links 
 AB.com Allen Bradley
 Rockwell Automation

Companies based in Milwaukee
Manufacturing companies based in Wisconsin